Matthew Mendelsohn is a Canadian public policy expert and public sector executive, best known for leading Prime Minister’s Justin Trudeau’s Results & Delivery Unit and the Government of Canada’s Impact & Innovation Unit from 2016-2020. These followed his role as a chief architect of the Liberals’ 2015 election platform and serving as a member of incoming Prime Minister Trudeau’s transition team, helping with cabinet selection and penning open and public Ministerial mandate letters.

He was the Founding Director of the Mowat Centre in 2009, a Canadian public policy think tank at the University of Toronto. He had previously served as a deputy minister in the Ontario Government and was a professor of Political Science at Queen’s University.

He is currently a Visiting Professor at Toronto Metropolitan University in Toronto after announcing his decision to leave the federal government in February 2020. He is also a Senior Advisor with Boston Consulting Group's Global Public Sector Practice. He lives in Toronto with his wife, Kirsten Mercer, a lawyer and a partner at Goldblatt Partners, and their two children.

Early life
Mendelsohn grew up in Montreal, Canada. He graduated from West Hill High School, a public school in the Notre-Dame-de-Grace neighbourhood. He received a B.A. in Political science from McGill University and a Ph.D. in Political Science from l’Université de Montréal. While attending university, Mendelsohn was president of the McGill Debating Union and the Canadian University Society for Intercollegiate Debate, and won the award for Top Speaker at the 1987 Canadian National Debating Championship and the third place speaker award at the World Championships at Fordham University in 1986.

Academic career 
Mendelsohn joined the Department of Political Studies at Queen’s University in 1992, following a post-doctoral fellowship at the University of British Columbia. He taught courses and published in the areas of Canadian Politics, quantitative research methods, public opinion and data analysis, democratic institutions, federalism, political communications and elections. He received tenure in 1999. His scholarly work on media, public opinion, federalism, Canadian values, referendums, democratic institutions and Quebec nationalism was widely cited.

During his time at Queen’s, he was the chief architect of the Portraits of Canada survey conducted for the Centre for Research and Information on Canada, designed the survey for the Globe and Mail’s New Canada Project and served as the Director of the Canadian Opinion Research Archive.

The Mowat Centre 
Matthew founded the Mowat Centre in February 2009 in the School of Public Policy & Governance at the University of Toronto with $5M in seed funding from the Government of Ontario. The Mowat Centre had a mandate to advance evidence-based policy solutions relevant to Ontario and informed by issues facing the province.

The Mowat Centre became a leading voice in debates over labour market policy, social policy, fiscal arrangements, energy policy, democratic institutions, the not-for-profit sector and public sector reform. It has been credited with delivering policy solutions to a wide variety of problems faced by governments, including health care reform, the drawing of electoral boundaries and skills development programs. It became best known for controversial papers on Equalization, Employment Insurance and the National Hockey League. Mendelsohn became well-known for his analysis of the negative impact of federal policies on Ontario, Toronto and cities. Its most cited report was its Task Force Report on unemployment insurance.

By 2014, the Mowat Centre had 30 staff members and an annual operating budget of $2.5M, consisting of $900,000 in government and the rest in private funding. It was closed in 2018, three years after Mendelsohn’s departure, attracting media attention. The Munk Centre at the University of Toronto continues to maintain the Mowat Centre website.

Public Service Career

Ontario Government 
Mendelsohn was recruited by Premier Dalton McGuinty and Cabinet Secretary Tony Dean to head up the Democratic Renewal Secretariat in 2004. The main accomplishment of the DRS was the establishment of the Citizens’ Assembly on Electoral Reform, widely hailed as an innovative experiment in deliberative democracy. The Assembly was followed by a referendum on a proposal for a Mixed Member Proportional electoral system. The conduct of the referendum was widely criticized as being stacked against change, and the proposal went down to defeat.

Mendelsohn became Ontario’s Deputy Minister of Intergovernmental and International Affairs in 2005, leading Ontario’s ‘fair share’ campaign and re-negotiating many intergovernmental agreements with the federal government. Liberal Premier McGuinty and Conservative Prime Minister Stephen Harper were involved in an often bitter political battle at this time, with Harper and his Ministers leveling a variety of attacks on McGuinty, calling him the small man of Confederation and urging international investors to avoid investing in Ontario due to McGuinty’s policies, including aggressive climate policies and increased taxes and social spending.

The battle culminated with repeated efforts from Prime Minister Harper to redraw the electoral map to give Ontario voters less representation in the House of Commons and re-arrange Canada’s fiscal arrangements to reduce transfers to Ontario. The Ontario government is widely credited with resisting these attempts and rolling back Harper’s efforts to shift power away from Toronto and Ontario. Mendelsohn directed these efforts within the public service and Ontario’s campaigns eventually led to more cordial relationships between the two governments and successful collaboration on infrastructure projects and a move toward a harmonized value added tax between the federal and provincial governments.

Federal Government 
Mendelsohn led the polling unit for the Privy Council Office in the aftermath of the 1995 referendum, supporting federal efforts to pass the Calgary Declaration recognizing Quebec’s unique place in Canada, the Social Union Framework Agreement and the Supreme Court Reference on Quebec’s right to secede and the subsequent Clarity Act, outlining the obligations on the part of governments should Quebecers vote to secede from Canada. Mendelsohn published academic work using data from his time in government on the Quebec nationalist movement. Mendelsohn argued that inter-personal variables and the importance of ‘feelings’ had been underplayed in previous scholarship focused on rational choice models.

Mendelsohn was appointed the first Deputy Secretary to the Cabinet for Results & Delivery in February 2015. Mendelsohn’s appointment was controversial because he had worked on the Liberal platform.

Mendelsohn described his role as shifting the culture of the federal government toward implementation and measurement of impact by tracking progress on implementation of the government’s agenda on behalf of the Prime Minister, helping Ministers overcome obstacles to success and helping Departments clarify their desired outcomes, metrics, measures of success and evaluation strategies.

Mendelsohn’s work became closely associated with Sir Michael Barber’s “Deliverology” approach when Barber and Mendelsohn appeared at the Trudeau government’s first cabinet retreat. Mendelsohn himself never used the term “deliverology” when describing his work, outlining his goals as helping Ministers be clear about their goals, departments are organized to implement, and relentless in measuring progress and recalibrating. Mendelsohn continued to appear at all cabinet retreats, outlining the government’s progress on meeting it commitments.

The Results and Delivery Unit (RDU) was responsible for working with departments to implement agile processes to more effectively hit targets on things like the reduction of child poverty, the elimination of boil water advisories for Indigenous communities and conservation.

In November 2017, the government released a public tracker reporting on its progress on mandate letters. Many editorialists were critical of the enterprise, finding the language too bureaucratic and disagreeing with some of the characterizations of whether commitments had been met or not. Mendelsohn himself dismissed these criticisms, insisting that tracking mandate letter commitments was an important part of transparency and accountability. Independent academic research later concluded that the Trudeau Government had done a better job of keeping its commitments than any government in Canadian history.

Mendelsohn also insisted publicly that the culture change, focus on outcomes, capacity building on implementation and new investments and governance on data were the most important aspects of the work of the Results and Delivery Unit and the Impact and Innovation Unit.

He argued publicly that the focus of the Trudeau government on building capacity around data analytics, digital infrastructure and project execution paid off in 2020 when the government successfully rolled out new programs in response to COVID-19.

Mendelsohn’s team at the Impact and Innovation Unit (IIU) oversaw the creation of the Impact Canada Platform, which experiments with outcomes-based funding approaches to program delivery. Most of its most successful projects have been Prize Challenges, including Canada’s Smart Cities Challenge. The IIU also led the Government of Canada’s work on behavioural science and experimented with using behavioural insights to increase take up rates of benefit programs for low income Canadians. Mendelsohn spoke publicly that the role of the IIU was to measure whether program dollars were having maximum impact.

Mendelsohn wrote that the IIU and the RDU were complementary by relentlessly focusing on implementation, measuring outcomes and using evidence to inform policy and program decisions. The IIU oversaw the development of the Government of Canada’s blog on innovation, which showcased the government’s efforts on human-centred design, data analytics, impact measurement, co-creation, outcomes-based funding and behavioural science.

During his time in Ottawa, he was identified as one of the most powerful people in the government and referred to as ‘the policy guru’ while being the person responsible for ensuring the Government delivered on its campaign manifesto.

Justin Trudeau Campaign 
Mendelsohn took a leave from the Mowat Centre during the spring of 2015 and during that time wrote the first draft of what would become the Trudeau platform, which included key elements of Trudeau’s pitch to Canadians, like enhanced child benefits, Senate reform, aggressive action on climate change, improvements to unemployment insurance, pension enhancement, more activist industrial policy, deficit spending and tax fairness. Following the election campaign, he was appointed to Justin Trudeau’s transition team and was involved in Cabinet selection and responsible for penning most of the Ministerial Mandate Letters. The public release of open mandate letters became an early signal of the kind of government Trudeau hoped to lead.

Community Service and Volunteer Work 
Mendelsohn has served on many not-for-profit boards, including the United Way Toronto, Civix, Civic Action, and Farm Radio International. He also served as the Chair of the Board for the Council of the Great Lakes Region. Mendelsohn was a founding member of the Banff Forum, speaking at the first two annual meetings and serving on the program committee. He is a certified member of the Institute of Corporate Directors.

References

Living people
Year of birth missing (living people)
Canadian civil servants
People from Montreal
Canadian Jews
McGill University alumni
Université de Montréal alumni